The ceremonial county of West Midlands, England, is divided into 28 parliamentary constituencies, each of which elect one Member of Parliament (MP) to the House of Commons. These constituencies were first implemented at the 2010 general election. All are borough constituencies except for Meriden, which is a county constituency.

Constituencies

2010 boundary changes
Under the Fifth Periodic Review of Westminster constituencies, the Boundary Commission for England decided to reduce the number of seats in West Midlands from 29 to 28, resulting in the abolition of Birmingham, Sparkbrook and Small Heath and leading to significant changes to other constituencies in the City of Birmingham.

Former boundaries

Current boundaries

Proposed boundary changes 
See 2023 Periodic Review of Westminster constituencies for further details.

Following the abandonment of the Sixth Periodic Review (the 2018 review), the Boundary Commission for England formally launched the 2023 Review on 5 January 2021. Initial proposals were published on 8 June 2021 and, following two periods of public consultation, revised proposals were published on 8 November 2022. Final proposals will be published by 1 July 2023.

The commission has proposed that the Black Country be combined with Staffordshire as a sub-region of the West Midlands Region, resulting in the creation of a new cross-county boundary constituency named Kingswinford and South Staffordshire, which would include part of the abolished constituency of Dudley South. As a consequence of knock-on changes, Dudley North would be renamed Dudley, Halesowen and Rowley Regis renamed Halesowen, and Wolverhampton South West renamed Wolverhampton West. In the Borough of Sandwell, Warley would be renamed Smethwick, and the two West Bromwich seats (East and West) would be realigned to create Tipton and Wednesbury, and West Bromwich. In the Borough of Walsall, Walsall North and Walsall South would be replaced by the single constituency of Walsall and Bloxwich.

The following constituencies are proposed:

Containing wards from Birmingham
Birmingham Edgbaston
Birmingham Erdington
Birmingham Hall Green
Birmingham Hodge Hill (part)
Birmingham Ladywood
Birmingham Northfield
Birmingham Perry Barr
Birmingham Selly Oak
Birmingham Yardley
Sutton Coldfield
Containing wards from Coventry
Coventry East
Coventry North West
Coventry South
Containing wards from Dudley
Dudley
Halesowen (part)
Kingswinford and South Staffordshire (part also in South Staffordshire District)
Stourbridge
Tipton and Wednesbury (part)
Containing wards from Sandwell
Halesowen (part)
Smethwick
Tipton and Wednesbury (part)
West Bromwich
Containing wards from Solihull
Birmingham Hodge Hill (part)
Meriden
Solihull
Containing wards from Walsall
Aldridge-Brownhills
Walsall and Bloxwich
Wolverhampton North East (part)
Wolverhampton South East (part)
Containing wards from Wolverhampton
Wolverhampton North East (part)
Wolverhampton South East (part)
Wolverhampton West

Results history
Primary data source: House of Commons research briefing - General election results from 1918 to 2019

2019 
The number of votes cast for each political party who fielded candidates in constituencies comprising West Midlands in the 2019 general election were as follows:

Percentage votes 

11997 - includes The Speaker, Betty Boothroyd who stood unopposed by the 3 main parties in West Bromwich West

21983 & 1987 - SDP-Liberal Alliance

* Included in Other

Seats 

11983 & 1987 - SDP-Liberal Alliance

Maps

Historical representation by party 
A cell marked → (with a different colour background to the preceding cell) indicates that the previous MP continued to sit under a new party name.

See also
 List of parliamentary constituencies in the West Midlands (region)

References

West Midlands (county)-related lists
 
West Midlands